Centre for Air Power Studies may refer to:

 Royal Air Force Centre for Air Power Studies, UK
 Centre for Air Power Studies (India)